Domaine de la Vougeraie is a Burgundy wine producer in the town of Premeaux-Prissey, France. They produce wine from vineyards in the Côte de Nuits and the Côte de Beaune.

History

The domaine was founded in 1999 when Jean-Charles Boisset decided to consolidate what he considered the best  of his family's vineyards into one domaine.

The vineyards that became Domaine de la Vougeraie were acquired by the Boissets over a nearly 50-year period, beginning with a  plot north of Gevrey-Chambertin in 1964. Over time, the family acquired both vineyard plots and entire domaines, making Boisset Family Estates the largest producer of wine in Burgundy.

The original winemaker at the domaine was Pascal Marchand, who turned winemaking duties over to Pierre Vincent in 2006.

Vineyards, viticulture, and winemaking

The vineyards controlled by the domaine include the former domaines of Claudine Deschamps, Pierre Ponnelle, Louis Voilland and L’Héritier-Guyot, along with vineyard plots owned by the Boissets. All of the domaine's vineyards use biodynamic techniques, and are certified organic; the domaine is the largest organic and biodynamic producer in the Côte d'Or (which includes the Côte de Nuits and the Côte de Beaune), with organically-farmed wines from the villages through Grand Cru vineyards.  of the domaine are worked with horse-drawn plows.

Holdings include the monopoles of Le Clos du Prieuré, where both white and red wines are produced, and the Premier Cru vineyard Le Clos Blanc de Vougeot. Grand Cru holdings include Charmes-Chambertin Les Mazoyères, Bonnes Mares, Musigny, Clos de Vougeot, Corton Le Clos du Roi, and Corton-Charlemagne Le Charlemagne.

Grapes for the domaine's wine are destemmed, crushed, and macerated for 4–5 days. Ambient wild yeast are used for fermentation, which takes place in open wooden vats. The wine is barrel-aged, with the percentage of new barrels ranging from 30% to 100%.

See also
Boisset Family Estates

References

Burgundy (historical region) wine producers
Côte-d'Or